Hypocalyptus is a genus of flowering plants in the legume family, Fabaceae. It belongs to the subfamily Faboideae and is the only genus found in tribe Hypocalypteae.

Species
Hypocalyptus comprises the following species:
 Hypocalyptus coluteoides (Lam.) R. Dahlgren
 Hypocalyptus oxalidifolius (Sims) Baill.
 Hypocalyptus sophoroides (P. J. Bergius) Baill.

Species names with uncertain taxonomic status
The status of the following species is unresolved:
 Hypocalyptus calyptratus (Retz.) Thunb.
 Hypocalyptus capensis Thunb.
 Hypocalyptus cordifolius Taub.
 Hypocalyptus oxalidifolius (Sims) Phillips
 Hypocalyptus pedunculatus (Thunb.) Thunb.
 Hypocalyptus sericeus Thunb.

References

Faboideae
Taxa named by Aimé Bonpland
Fabaceae genera